Gabriele "Gaby" Seyfert (later Rüger, then Messerschmidt, now Körner, born 23 November 1948) is a German former figure skater. She is a two-time World champion (1969, 1970), and the 1968 Olympic silver medalist.

She is the first lady to successfully land a triple loop jump in competition.

Skating career 
Seyfert skated for the club SC Karl-Marx-Stadt and represented East Germany. Her coach was her mother Jutta Müller, who also coached 1984 and 1988 Olympic champion Katarina Witt. She was a long-time rival of Peggy Fleming, but never defeated her.

In 1966, after two silver medals at the Europeans and the Worlds, she was voted as "the GDR female athlete of the year". She became the first woman to land a clean triple loop.

Seyfert ended her figure skating career in 1970. Unlike Peggy Fleming, she was not allowed to skate professionally. Offers by Holiday on Ice were refused by East German authorities. She was a Stasi informer under the codename "Perle".

Seyfert turned to coaching, and worked with Anett Pötzsch in the early 1970s. The East German coach hierarchy later transferred Pötzsch to Jutta Müller's group, and Seyfert ended her coaching career.

Personal life 
She married ice dancer Eberhard Rüger in 1972 and they had a daughter in 1974. She then married Jochen Messerschmidt. In 2011, she married Egbert Körner.

After ending her coaching career, Seyfert studied languages at university and worked as a professional translator. From 1985 to 1991, she led the ice ballet at the Friedrichstadtpalast in East Berlin, where she also skated occasionally. After the ice ballet was closed, she worked at a service industry business in Berlin. She lives in Berlin-Karow.

Results

References 

 Seyfert, Gaby: Da muss noch was sein: Mein Leben – mehr als Pflicht und Kür, 1998, 
 Seyfert, Gaby: Auf Wolke eins ist immer Platz. Single sucht Single, 2000, 
 Olga Fluegge, Gaby Seyfert: First Star of Eastern Germany

Navigation

1948 births
Living people
German female single skaters
Figure skaters at the 1964 Winter Olympics
Figure skaters at the 1968 Winter Olympics
Olympic figure skaters of the United Team of Germany
Olympic figure skaters of East Germany
Olympic silver medalists for East Germany
Sportspeople from Chemnitz
Olympic medalists in figure skating
World Figure Skating Championships medalists
European Figure Skating Championships medalists
Medalists at the 1968 Winter Olympics
People of the Stasi
20th-century German women
East German figure skaters
East German sportswomen
People from Bezirk Karl-Marx-Stadt